Patrick Sussek (born 8 February 2000) is a German footballer who plays as a midfielder for Berliner AK 07.

Career
Sussek made his professional debut for FC Ingolstadt in the 3. Liga on 22 July 2019, coming on as a substitute in the 90+3rd minute for Maximilian Wolfram in the 2–1 away win against Carl Zeiss Jena.

References

External links
 Profile at DFB.de
 Profile at kicker.de

2000 births
Living people
Sportspeople from Ingolstadt
Footballers from Bavaria
German footballers
Germany youth international footballers
Association football midfielders
FC Ingolstadt 04 II players
FC Ingolstadt 04 players
Fortuna Düsseldorf II players
Berliner AK 07 players
3. Liga players
Regionalliga players
Oberliga (football) players